Pesyane is a rural locality (a village) in Filippovskoye Rural Settlement, Kirzhachsky District, Vladimir Oblast, Russia. The population was 330 as of 2010. There are 12 streets.

Geography 
Pesyane is located 28 km south of Kirzhach (the district's administrative centre) by road. Karpovshchina is the nearest rural locality.

References 

Rural localities in Kirzhachsky District